Paku Alam V was Duke (Adipati) of Pakualaman between 1878 and 1900.
Pakualaman (also written Paku Alaman) became a small hereditary Duchy within the Sultanate of Yogyakarta, as a mirror-image of Mangkunegaran in the territory of the Susuhunanate of Surakarta

The son of Paku Alam IV, Paku Alam V was the instigator of and buried at the graveyard in Girigondo.

Subsequent list of rulers
 Paku Alam VI, 1901 – 1902
 Paku Alam VII, 1903 – 1938
 Paku Alam VIII, 1938 – 1999
 Paku Alam IX, 1999 — 2015
 Paku Alam X, 2015 -

Family history

Notes

1900 deaths
Dukes of Pakualaman
Pakualaman
Burials at Girigondo
19th-century Indonesian people
Indonesian royalty
Indonesian Freemasons